A. penangiana  may refer to:
 Abacopteris penangiana, a synonym for Menisciopsis penangiana, a fern species
 Acampe penangiana, a synonym for Acampe rigida, an orchid species
 Alstonia penangiana, a plant species endemic to Malaysia
 Atuna penangiana, a plant species endemic to Malaysia